Diosmani González (Camagüey, 1973) is a paralympic athlete from Cuba competing mainly in category T12 long-distance events.

Diosmani competed in the 1996 Summer Paralympics winning gold in the T12 10000m and silver in the 5000m as well as competing in the Marathon.  After missing the 2000 games he returned in 2004 Summer Paralympics to compete in the 1500m and 5000m and won the silver medal in the 10000m.

References

Paralympic athletes of Cuba
Athletes (track and field) at the 1996 Summer Paralympics
Athletes (track and field) at the 2004 Summer Paralympics
Paralympic gold medalists for Cuba
Paralympic silver medalists for Cuba
Living people
Sportspeople from Camagüey
1973 births
Medalists at the 2004 Summer Paralympics
Medalists at the 1996 Summer Paralympics
Paralympic medalists in athletics (track and field)
Cuban male long-distance runners
Visually impaired long-distance runners
Paralympic long-distance runners